Zamalek Sporting Club, commonly referred to as Zamalek, is an Egyptian sports club based in Giza. It is one of the most successful football clubs in Africa and the Middle East,
 and was the most titled club in African tournaments in the 20th century. The club is mainly known for its professional football team, which plays in the Egyptian Premier League, the top tier of the Egyptian football league system.

The club was founded on 5 January 1911 as Qasr El Nile Club and was first headed by the Belgian lawyer George Merzbach. The name was changed two years later to Cairo International Sports Club (C.I.S.C.), colloquially El Qāhirah El Mokhtalat Club or El Mokhtalat Club. The club was renamed in 1941 after King Farouk of Egypt and became known as Farouk El Awal Club. After the 1952 Egyptian revolution, the club changed its name again to Zamalek SC .

Zamalek established itself as the second major force in Egyptian football during the 1920s, as it became the second Egyptian team to win titles. Zamalek was the first Egyptian team to win Sultan Hussein Cup in 1921 and 1922, the Egypt Cup in 1922; and the Cairo League in 1922–23. It is one of two clubs that have played in every season of the Egyptian Premier League, and one of seven that have never been relegated to the Egyptian Second Division.

At the international level, it has won five CAF Champions League titles, one CAF Confederation Cup title, four CAF Super Cup titles and one African Cup Winners' Cup title; making it one of the most successful clubs in Africa. It is also the first Egyptian team to ever win the CAF Super Cup when it beat archrival Al Ahly in the 1994 CAF Super Cup. Zamalek was the first Egyptian team to participate in and win the Afro-Asian Cup in 1987; and holds the record for most participations (1987, 1994, and 1997) and most titles after winning it a second time in 1997. Zamalek is also the first
Egyptian team to ever qualify to the FIFA Club World Cup
when it qualified in 2000 to the 2001 championship,
despite the cancellation of the championship later on.

History

Early years, Qasr El Nile Club (1911–1913) 
 

Little is known about the very early years of the club. According to historians, the club was established by Belgian lawyer George Merzbach. On the 25 December 1910, Merzbach realized that the Cairo Tramways Company’s guest house hosting the celebration on the Nile banks was suitable as a sports club headquarters while attending the company's Christmas celebration. Merzbach decided to establish a new club for Belgians, Egyptians, and foreigners. At the time, Gezira Sporting Club, the main sporting club in Cairo, was exclusively for the British Army and unavailable for non-British foreigners and Egyptians. For the new club, he chose the name Qasr El Nile. He did not have difficulties in establishing the club, as he enjoyed strong ties within the Palace of Khedive Abbas II, as well as many friendships with senior officials of Egyptian society. He was also the private lawyer for both Baron Empain and the Cairo Tramways Company. On 5 January 1911 the club was established, and it was officially opened on February 6 of the same year.

The first board of directors consisted of Merzbach as president, archaeologist Howard Carter as vice president, and Noah Amin Abdullah, Ahmed Mahmoud Azzam, Khoury Chalhoub (Lebanese, Representative of the Cairo Tramways Company), and Paolo Esposito (Italian, Representative of the Khedivial Palace) as board members. It was the first club in Cairo to emerge from non-English expatriate communities. They formed sports and social clubs, each with its own identity. An essential aspect of the club was that it was for all people and not for any specific social, economic, or ethnic community. It started out and continued through World War I under Merzbach's presidency.

Cairo International Sports Club (C.I.S.C.), El Mokhtalat Club (1913–1941) 

In 1913, the club moved to what is currently known as the High Court and changed its name to Cairo International Sports Club (C.I.S.C.), colloquially referred to as the El Qāhirah El Mokhtalat Club or El Mokhtalat Club. The second president of the club was Nicolas Arfagi Bianchi, who played as a left winger for the club's football team. In 1915, Ibrahim Allam "Juhainah" moved to the club with his football team, coming from EL Sekka EL Hadid SC. In 1917, Zamalek had the legacy of participating as the first and only Egyptian football club in Sultan Hussein Cup, the first official football competition in Egypt. Zamalek played great matches and reached the final match against the English GHQ Signals team, the first champion of the competition. The championship was managed by the Egyptian Ibrahim Allam and was organized under the auspices of the Sultan of Egypt Hussein Kamel. After Zamalek's historic first season, many Egyptian cubs announced their desire to participate in the competition as they found it serious, official, bearing the name of the country's sultan, and includes a trophy for the winning team. Also in 1917, Ibrahim Allam and the Egyptian members of the club began their revolution to nationalize the club and remove the foreigners from the club's board of directors which mainly consisted of members of the Belgian and French communities. It started with informing the authorities that the club did not have a general assembly for 3 years, the club records are illegally kept with the club secretary, and have not been legally audited. Allam also put the club under the protection of 17-20 men from Bulaq, to preserve it and protect its Egyptian members. The Ministry of the Interior and some foreign embassies in Cairo interfered, but non-Egyptians were not allowed to enter the club. Finally Allam agreed to turn in the club to Mr. Bianchi in the presence of an official force from the police. The Egyptian members realized that it was important to gain a majority at the general members meeting. Accordingly, Allam and the Egyptian members called for an extraordinary general assembly for the club at Al-Shawarby Street. A decision was made by the general assembly to withdraw confidence from the club's foreign board of directors and elect a new Egyptian board of directors. When the elections were held, the first Egyptian board was elected with Mohammad Badr as president, Mostafa Hassan as treasurer, Ibrahim Allam as General Secretary, and Nicola Arkaji, Mahmoud Bassyouni, Hussein Fawzy, and Abdo El Jabalawy as board members. After the first board, a new saif in 1923 was formed with Mohamed Heidar as president and Youssef Mohamad as secretary. The new board of directors held its first meeting and decided to continue the fight. They informed the authorities of the missing club records. As a result, no general members' meetings were held for the next few years and later, Mr. Shoudoi, the Belgian club secretary was summoned and agreed to turn in the club records. 
Around that time Zamalek received the moniker "Qahir-al-Aganib" (the conqueror of foreigners) due to their many wins against renowned foreign teams. In 1921, Zamalek won the Sultan Hussein Cup, becoming the first Egyptian team to ever win a title, after its victory over Britain's Sherwood Foresters (2–1). In 1922, Zamalek won the first Egyptian Cup and two weeks later won the Sultan Hussein Cup for the second time. Also in 1922, the Cairo Region League was launched, and the club won twice (1922 and 1940).In the winter of 1924, the club moved to a location on the west bank of the River Nile, and west of Gezira island, and became known as the Cairo International Sports Club (C.I.S.C.)-Zamalek.
 The 1924 location is occupied by El Balloon Theater today. Among the impressive results during that period was the famous victories against Al Ahly 6-0 which happened twice; in 1940 and 1942.

Farouk El Awal Club (1941–1952) 

In the 1940s, Zamalek won the King's Cup, and the Cairo Region League Championship in its 1940–41 season. After a year, Zamalek lost the final of the cup to Al-Ahly. In 1941, Farouk I, King of Egypt and Sudan, bestowed the royal sponsorship on the club, and the club name was renamed to Nady Farouk El Awal. Ismail Bak Shirin of Mohammed Ali's family took the post of vice president.
This period witnessed the biggest victories in the history of the Cairo derby (contested with Al Ahly), a pair of 6–0 wins for Zamalek in 1941–42 and 1943–1944.This record scoreline in the Cairo derby has not been broken since then.

Zamalek Sporting Club and the post-1952 period (1952–1960) 

After the army coup in 1952, the club was renamed Zamalek after the area where the club was situated. The club later moved for the last time to 26 July Street, and occupied an area of 35 acres (140,000 m2) and hosted 24 different sports. A new board was formed with Mohammad Shawky as president and secretary and Mohammad Hassan Helmy as assistant secretary. At the time, the rules required that half the club board be changed every year, and Helmy took the position of secretary-general. In 1954, the stadium needed renovations, so the board sought a businessman to take over the club and guide the renovation. Abd El Hamid El Shawarbi became the president, and although he was elected for a second period, he was not able to do the job he wanted. Heidar Pasha and Haj Sayed El Annany contributed to forming the VIP stands and the first-class stands, which happened while El Shawarbi was outside Egypt. When he returned, he resigned and the board continued after Shawky stepped up from his deputy position to continue till September 1955. Businessman Abd El Latif Abo Regeila became the club president in 1956; by then, the rules had been changed allowing the board to stay for three years. Shawky stepped down for Regeila, although he was re-elected as a club president. Although Regeila was re-elected for a second term, he had to leave Egypt after he lost money from the governmental policy against private property. The club continued to search for another businessman, and chose Alwe El Gazzar, the owner of El Sheikh Sherieb Company and the president of the board of the Coca-Cola Company at this time.

First league championship and the start of local glittering (1960–1983) 

Abu Regeila was an Egyptian businessman and pioneer of public transport buses in Cairo. During his reign, the construction of the Zamalek Stadium was established, as well as the social building continued as the club's official president until 1961. In 1961, Zamalek paid Real Madrid to play against Zamalek. Hamada Emam was a popular player on the club who helped raise the club's profile. In 1962, there was a new board with Hassan Amer as a president, emeritus deputy Shawky, Mohammad Lateef, Galal Kereitam, Mahmoud Emam, and Mahmoud Hafez. Amer stayed as president until the Egyptian army's defeat in 1967.
 After the Egyptian army's defeat in the 1967 Six Day War Zamalek hosted Ismaily SC and Al Masry SC clubs, as well as the other Suez Canal teams at its grounds.

 In 1967, Minister of Youth and Sports Talat Khairy decided that the club boards would be appointed rather than elected, and Helmy took the presidency and was the first Egyptian sportsman in Egypt to become a president of a club. He remained as president until July 1971 where the rules were changed to allow board elections again and to forbid anyone from being president if they had already held to presidency for two consecutive terms. Tawfeek El Kheshen took over the presidency and the honorary presidency was given to Helmy.The 1970s generation was one of the best generations of football in Zamalek, and it included legendary players in the history of Egyptian and Arab football. In 1973, Helmy was elected president and stayed as the head of the board till 1984.
Zamalek won the Egyptian Premier League in its 1959–60 season. Zamalek won the Egyptian Premier League five times (1959–60, 1963–64, 1964–65, 1977–78, and 1983–84) and the Egyptian Cup in 1960, 1962, 1975, 1977, and 1979. The club also won the October Cup, which is the tournament that was held as an alternative to the Egyptian Premier League because of Egypt hosting the 1974 African Nations Cup.

African Uprising (1984–2004) 
Zamalek won the first African title against Nigeria's Shooting Stars after beating them in Cairo (2–0) and in Nigeria (0–1).

In 1984, Amer became president, followed by Hasan Abo el Fetouh in 1988. In 1990, Galal Ibrahim became the temporary president of the club after Fetouh died until September 1990, when the general club meeting was held and Mohamad Nour El Daly was elected president. In 1992, Galal Ibrahim became the new president. The club's president from 1992 to 1996 was Jalal Ibrahim, and the rules were changed to require that the vice treasurer be selected mostly by the board members; Hamada Emam was selected by default to that position while Abdel Hamid Shaheen was elected treasurer. The board members were Ahmed Shereen Fawzy, Mahmoud Marouf, Mohamad Fayez El Zummur, Raouf Gaser, and Tarek Ghonaim. The new rules required the board to have two members under the age of 30; for these two spots, Samy Abo El Kheir and Ihab Ibrahim were elected. The members appointed by the high committee for youth and sports were Mohamad Amer, General Hanafy Reyad, and Farouk Abo El Nasr.

In 1993, Zamalek won the CAF Champions League. By 1994, Shaheen was not able to continue his duties due to his sickness, but the board chose to keep him in the position in honor of his devotion to the club, and Farouk Abo El Nasr was appointed to take over his duties while Shaheen stayed in his position. In 1995, four members in the board were removed due to their six absences from board meetings: Mahmoud Marouf, Mohamad Fayez El Zummur, and Amer. They were replaced with Mortada Mansour, Mahmoud Abdallah, Mounnir Hassan, and Ibrahim Latif. The high committee for youth and sports objected on linking the appointed members with the elected ones, so Hassan and Ibrahim Latif forfeited their positions. The newly two appointed members for the club board were Amer and El Nasr in support of their abilities and dedication. Fawzy was selected to be treasurer till the new elections. On 4 July, Abd El Menem Emarah decided to release the club board and the Egyptian Football Federation board after the game between Al-Ahly and Zamalek in 1995–96, and the board froze football activities in the club. A one-year temporary club board was selected with Kamal Darweesh as president, Abd EL Aziz Kabil as vice president, and board members Hanafy Reyad, Magdy Sharaf, Ismail Selim, Azmy Megahed, and Mohamad Abd El Rahman Fawzy. Accountant Mahmoud Badr El Deen was appointed as treasurer.

Kamal Darwish's Era 
Kamal Darwish was the president of Zamalek club for two terms from 1996 to 2005. Zamalek won 16 football championships during his reign, but overall he achieved 1186 championships in 24 games and he assumed the chairmanship of the Board of Directors in 2013 on a temporary board for the second time. He is the president with the most achievements in the history of Zamalek.

In 2000, there was a friendly match between Zamalek and Palestine national football team in Gaza after breaking the Zionist siege. Zamalek was named the best club in the world by the IFFHS in February 2003. It was also the first Egyptian team to qualify for the 2001 FIFA Club World Cup in Spain, though that competition did not happen because of funding problems. Zamalek won the African Champions League in 2002, two African Super Cups in 1996 and 2003, and the first two championships in the Egyptian Super Cup in 2001 and 2002.
Zamalek FC is the only team to achieve seven championships between the 2002–03 and 2003–04 seasons, surpassing FC Barcelona, who won six championships in one year.

Zamalek also won the Egyptian Premier League three times (2000–01, 2002–03 and 2003–04), and the Egypt Cup in 1999 and 2002.

Hazem emam is the icon of the Zamalek club, which won 14 championships with Zamalek club and the Egyptian national team, and he was called the imam of the talented players .

Regression (2005–2013) 
In 2005, many boards were dismissed by the Minister of Sport, which led to organizational uncertainty from 2005 to 2013, and changed the form of competition in Egypt for years. The football team only won two championships: the Egypt Cup in 2008 and 2013. The level of Zamalek continued to decline, and its administration destabilized since Morta Mansour assumed the presidency of the club in 2005. The council did not last long and was dissolved, and a council headed by Morsi Atallah came to run the club before Mansour returned to head the council. Mansour dissolved the board of directors before restoring it, and the National Sports Council intervened to appoint a council headed by Muhammad Amir for a year before elections were held in May 2009, which resulted in the election of Mamdouh Abbas as the club's president; Abbas' council was dissolved in 2010 after Mansour obtained a court ruling stating that the elections were rigged. The administrative authority appointed an interim council to manage the club headed by Jalal Ibrahim, before Abbas' council returned when Mansour abandoned his lawsuit. Taher Abu Zaid disbanded Abbas' council, and formed an interim council headed by Kamal Darwish to head Zamalek, but by appointment.

Mahmoud Shikabala was one of the most prominent talents in the history of Egyptian football, who carried the banner of Zamalek and preserved the popularity of Zamalek in that difficult period.

Reconstruction and reform

Mortada Mansour's era (2014–2020; 2021–present) 

In 2014, Mortada Mansour took over the club. Zamalek won the Egypt Cup in 2014 against Smouha (1–0). In the next season 2014–15 season, Zamalek won the Egyptian Premier League, and broke the record in obtaining the largest number of points in the league. The team won the Egypt Cup championship at the end of the year against Al-Ahly team (2–0), and reached the semifinals of the African CAF Confederation Cup in 2015.
 In 2016, Zamalek reached the finals in the CAF Champions League and won the Egypt Cup and the Egypt Super Cup. In 2018, the Zamalek football team won the Egypt Cup again.
 In 2019 Zamalek won the CAF Confederation Cup, the Egypt Cup, the Saudi-Egyptian Super Cup, the Egypt Super Cup, and the CAF Super Cup. Since 2014, the football team won 11 championships, the last of which was the Egyptian Super Cup and the African Super Cup that were achieved in the span of one week. Mansour announced that "The trademark 'Real Football Club of the Century' is registered in the Ministry of Supply and Trade in Egypt." Zamalek sent a complaint to the Egyptian Football Association in preparation for escalating the case of the Century Club to FIFA and the International Sports Court.

The Ministry of Youth and Sports suspended Zamalek's board of directors due to financial violations on Sunday 29 November 2020. The Egyptian Ministry of Sports and Youth named Emad Abdel-Aziz as Zamalek's new president to succeed Ahmed Bakry, who died due to COVID-19. Then Hussein Labib has been appointed the new Zamalek president of normalization committee. And the football team was able to obtain the Egyptian Premier League championship after the absence of six years from achieving the championship and The club was also able to win the Egypt Cup in the same year , despite the difficult conditions that the club was going through in 2021.

On 22 November 2021, Mansour and his board of directors officially returned back to Zamalek SC management, following the departure of the normalization committee until the club's elections. On 12 February 2022, Mansour became the president of Zamalek club for the third time, after the elections held by the club through the general assembly.
In the 2021-2022 season,the football team managed to achieve the Egyptian League for the second year in a row, despite the penalty of the International Football Association (FIFA) to suspend the players’ registration.

Names 
 Qasr El Nile Club (The Nile Palace) (1911–1913)
 Cairo International Sports Club (C.I.S.C.), a.k.a. El Mokhtalat Club (Mixed Courts) (1913–1941)
 Farouk El Awal Club (Farouk I Club) (1941–1952)
 Zamalek Sporting Club (ZSC) (1952–Present)

Renamed after Egypt's Zamalek Nile Island, one of the most prestigious areas of the capital and the word itself is an Egyptian-slang of the classical and standard Arabic word,, meaning Preciously owned.

Crest and colors 
 
In 1941, the royal emblem of the Kingdom of Egypt and Sudan was the official emblem of the club at the time; when the club's name changed from "Mixed Club" to "Farouk Club" by royal order from Farouk I. After the revolution on the royal rule in Egypt, the club's name and logo changed after the revolution of July 23, 1952; the logo became a mixture of the sporting model and the ancient Egyptian civilization. The logo's main colors express peace and struggle and have not changed since its establishment. The home jersey uses the original Zamalek colours. In the upper half of the logo, the arrow that points towards the target appears in a pharaonic uniform as an indication of the common goal between it and Zamalek.

Zamalek is famous for the stability of its basic colors, which have not changed throughout the club's history, which extends since 1911, as it is distinguished by the white dress with two parallel red lines in the middle. The team shirt is displayed on the chest, and the color symbolizes.

Kits

Kit suppliers and shirt sponsors

Kit evolution 

Source:

Grounds

Cairo International Stadium 

The club does not have a home ground. Their old stadium, Abdel-Latif Abu-Rajelha Stadium was not suitable for hosting the first team's official matches due to its limited capacity, its central downtown location, and need for renovations. The players train in Abdel-Latif Abo Regeila but play their home matches in Cairo International Stadium for local matches and continental matches.

Abdel-Latif Abu-Rajelha Stadium 

Abdel-Latif Abu-Rajelha Stadium, formerly known as Zamalek Stadium, then Mohammed Hassan Helmy "Zamora" Stadium, is a multi-use stadium in Cairo, Egypt. The stadium was initially named in honor of Helmy. It was renamed in 2014 to Abdel-Latif Abu-Rajelha Stadium after the former president of Zamalek, Abdel-Latif Abu-Rajelha. It is mostly used for football matches and was the home of Zamalek before they moved to Cairo International Stadium because of its small capacity. The stadium could hold 40,000 spectators before the capacity was reduced to 20,000 .

Supporters 

 
Zamalek has an ultras group named the Ultras White Knights that was founded on 17 March 2007 and is known for its pyrotechnic displays. Their motto is "Brotherhood in blood and fans of the free public Club". They were involved in clashes on 8 February 2015 before the league match between Zamalek and ENPI Club at the Cairo Air Defense Stadium, where 20 people were killed.

Club of the Century 

In February 2014 administration of Zamalek announced the nickname of the club as the Club of the Century, as the most successful club of the 20th century in Africa (gaining 9 titles versus 7 for its closest rival).

CAF ranking of African Clubs titles at the end of 20th century

Stadiums Disasters

Helmy Zamora Stadium disaster 1974 
At least 48 people died in a stampede at a friendly game against Czechoslovak club Dukla Prague at the Helmy Zamora Stadium in 1974.

30 June Stadium stampede 2015 

On 8 February 2015, 20 supporters were killed by policemen outside the 30 June Stadium.

Statistics and records

Appearances 

Source:

Goalscorers 

Most goals scored in all competitions: 138 – Abdel Halim Ali
Most goals scored in the League: 80 – Abdel Halim Ali
Most goals scored in October League Cup: 9 – Hassan Shehata
Most goals scored in Egypt Cup: 23 – Alaa El-Hamouly
Most goals scored in all African competitions: 23 – Abdel Halim Ali
Most goals scored in all Arabian competitions: 13 – Abdel Halim Ali

Awards winners 
African Footballer of The Year
The following players won African Footballer of the Year while playing for Zamalek:
 Emmanuel Amuneke – 1994

Matches 

First League match: Farouk (Zamalek) 5–1 El-Masry, Week 1, 22 October 1948.
First Egypt Cup match: Mokhtalat (Zamalek) 4–0 Tersana SC, first round, 3 March 1922.
First African Cup Winners' Cup match: Zamalek 3–0 Al Ahly (Tripoli), first round, 7 May 1976.
First CAF Champions League match: Zamalek 2–1 Simba F.C., first round, 16 March 1979.
First CAF Cup match: Zamalek 0–1 Gor Mahia, first round, 21 March 1998.
First CAF Confederation Cup match: Rayon Sports 3–1, 2nd round, 15 March 2015.
Longest Winning Streak: 10 matches (2012/2013).
Longest Clean sheet: 7 matches (2014–15 Egyptian Premier League).
Longest Unbeaten Streak in Egypt Cup (Egyptian Record): 22 matches (2013–2017).
Longest Unbeaten Home Streak in African Cups (African Record): 70 matches (1976–2005).

Individual

League 
 Ayman Younes scored the fastest goal in 1990 against Souss after 13 seconds.
 Mohamed Amin scored the first goal in the Egyptian League against El Masry.
 Saad Rostom scored the first hat trick for Zamalek in the league against El Masry.

The following players have won the top scorer award in the league while playing with Zamalek:

Cup 
 Hussein Yasser scored the fastest goal in the cup against Al Ahly in 2010 after 46 seconds.

Rivalries

Cairo Derby 

The Cairo Derby is a football match between Zamalek and Al Ahly. The derby is played twice each season with two matches in the Egyptian Premier League, but it is not uncommon to find the teams meeting each other in the Egypt Cup, especially in the finals, and in the CAF Champions League.

Mit Okba Derby 
The Mit Okba derby is a football match between Zamalek and Tersana SC. Both teams are located in the Mit Okba region in Giza. The derby was one of the most important matches of the Egyptian Premier League during the sixties and seventies of the twentieth century, but it gradually lost its value after Tersana SC's performance started to deteriorate and the club has been relegated more than once to the Egyptian Second Division where it currently plays after being relegated for the sixth time in the 2008–09 season.

Finances and ownership 
In 2018, Presentation Sports obtained a contract that increased from 100 million Egyptian pounds to 120 million annually to sponsor the club increased This increase in the sponsorship contract will be other than 20% over the amount mentioned in each year including broadcasting rights.

The financial cost of the new team uniform reached 9 million Egyptian pounds.

The Board of Directors of the National Bank of Egypt signed a contract with Zamalek's management to rent three stores in the club wall on the League of Arab States Street with a usufruct for 25 years, with a rent for two years in advance.
Zamalek Club signed a cooperation protocol with Banque Misr, from which it obtains immediate returns of 10 million pounds under the protocol. In return, Banque Misr has the right to use two local walls of the Zamalek Club wall for 20 years in exchange for 5 million pounds and an annual rent of 1.560 million pounds.

The report of the Controller at the Zamalek Club revealed that the budget surplus for the fiscal year 2018–2019 reached 170 million Egyptian pounds.

The temporary committee that runs the Zamalek club has signed a cooperation protocol with the Ministry of Military Production (Egypt) for a construction and sports boom.
Imad Abdel Aziz, head of the temporary committee at Zamalek Club, stated that this protocol will contribute to building the 6th of October branch.

Zamalek Club and Aerosport Sports Club of the Ministry of Civil Aviation signed a protocol of joint cooperation aimed at benefiting from the expertise of Zamalek.

Zamalek SC has signed a cooperation protocol with the “I-Friends Sports” company, to establish a branch of the club in the United Arab Emirates.

Popular culture

Zamalek TV 

Zamalek Club owns a TV channel known as Zamalek TV, which broadcasts on Nilesat in SD quality. The broadcast began experimentally on 31 December 2019 before the channel launched on 22 January 2020. The channel focuses on news about the club.

Zamalek Magazine 
Zamalek SC Magazine is an official Zamalek weekly magazine that is issued every Thursday, and contains news and reviews about the club and interviews with the players.

Documentaries 
In 2015, a documentary entitled Zamalek, O Engineering, playing, Art and Engineering, was produced by Abu Dhabi Sports. It was presented in two parts, and presents the history of the club since its foundation.

Another documentary film produced in 2016, Al Hekaya Mpethanish(The story does not end ),covers the club's history in the five championships in the African Champions League, and was produced by DMC Sport channel.

Another documentary film was produced by the CBC network in 2017, entitled Helmy Zamora. It covers the story of Helmy or Zamora the icon of Zamalek club.

Another documentary film was produced in 2019 with the title Zamalek Club, the National and Dignity Club. It was produced by the club, and shows the history of the club since its establishment.

Another documentary film produced in 2020 entitled Zamalek Legends: A long history of stars who inhabited the memory, produced by Abu Dhabi Sports channel, covers the highlight of the club's most prominent stars from different generations.

Another documentary film produced in 2020 entitled Zamalek – The Road to the African Super 2020, produced by beIN SPORTS Arabia channel, documents Zamalek's journey in winning the 2019 CAF Confederation Cup.

Another documentary film produced in 2020 entitled Zamalek, the Road to the Semi-finals 2020, produced by beIN SPORTS Arabia channel, describes Zamalek won the African Super Cup championship against Espérance Sportive de Tunis , and won the local super championship against Al Ahly.

Honours 

Zamalek is one of the top twenty clubs that won the most championships in the world, and is the seventh with the most continental and international championships, with a total of 13 continental honors.

 
  shared record

Players

Current squad

Out on loan

Players under contract

Youth team and reserves

Player records

Notable players 

This list includes players that have appeared in at least 100 league games and/or have reached international status.

Source:

Staff

Current technical staff

Medical staff

Board of Directors 

Source:

Other sports 
Zamalek participates in many sports besides football, such as Handball, Athletics, Volleyball, and Basketball. Zamalek has won many local, Arab and African tournaments and participated in world championships.

References

External links 

Zamalek SC on FIFA.com
Zamalek SC on CAF
Zamalek SC on Egyptian Football Association

 
Clubs and societies in Egypt
Sport in Giza
Football clubs in Egypt
Football clubs in Cairo
Sports clubs established in 1911
Association football clubs established in 1911
1911 establishments in Egypt
Sports clubs in Egypt
CAF Champions League winning clubs
CAF Confederation Cup winning clubs
African Cup Winners Cup winning clubs
CAF Super Cup winning clubs